William Warbrick (born 6 March 1998) is a New Zealand professional rugby league footballer who plays for the Melbourne Storm in the NRL.

Early life
Warbrick was born and raised in Kawerau, New Zealand. He was educated at Rotorua Boys' High School and excelled in athletics, Rugby Union and League. Warbrick played junior rugby league for Ngongotaha Chiefs in the Bay of Plenty Rugby League.

Career

Australian Rules Football
Warbrick began playing Australian rules football as a junior in 2016 on the recommendation of his junior rugby league coach and played for the Western Crows in the AFL New Zealand premiership where he won the Rising Star award and developed as a strong marking forward/midfielder. He was later selected for the New Zealand national Australian rules football team (U18 and senior) and toured Melbourne with the national team to play against the Australian AFL AIS Academy team.

Rugby Sevens
Warbrick made his debut for the New Zealand national rugby sevens team in 2019. In 2021, he won a silver medal at the 2020 Summer Olympics.

Rugby League
On 4 November 2021, Warbrick signed with the Melbourne Storm on a two-year contract. He spent majority of the 2021-22 playing for the feeder club Sunshine Coast Falcons.

In round 1 of the 2023 NRL season, Warbrick made his NRL and Melbourne Storm debut against the Parramatta Eels. He had his Storm debut jersey (cap 225) presented to him by his sister.

References

External Links
 Melbourne Storm profile

1998 births
Living people
Melbourne Storm players
New Zealand rugby league players
New Zealand rugby union players
Rugby union flankers
People from Kawerau
New Zealand international rugby sevens players
Olympic rugby sevens players of New Zealand
New Zealand male rugby sevens players
Rugby sevens players at the 2020 Summer Olympics
Olympic medalists in rugby sevens
Olympic silver medalists for New Zealand
Medalists at the 2020 Summer Olympics
Rugby league players from the Bay of Plenty Region
Rugby union players from the Bay of Plenty Region